Nizhny Kislyay is an urban locality (an urban-type settlement) in Buturlinovsky District of Voronezh Oblast, Russia. Population:

References

Urban-type settlements in Voronezh Oblast